Park Seok-jin (Hangul: 박석진, Hanja: 朴石鎮) (born July 19, 1972) is a retired South Korean baseball player who played for the Lotte Giants, Samsung Lions and LG Twins of the KBO League. He was noted for his distinct sidearm delivery.

Park was a member of the 2000 South Korea national baseball team that won the bronze medal in the 2000 Summer Olympics.

External links 
 Profile and stats on the KBO official site
 Olympics Database Profile

1972 births
Baseball players at the 2000 Summer Olympics
Dankook University alumni
KBO League pitchers
Kyungnam High School alumni
LG Twins coaches
LG Twins players
Living people
Lotte Giants players
Medalists at the 2000 Summer Olympics
Olympic bronze medalists for South Korea
Olympic baseball players of South Korea
Olympic medalists in baseball
Samsung Lions players
South Korean baseball coaches
South Korean baseball players
Sportspeople from Busan